The Allmand–Archer House is a historic house located at 327 Duke Street in the West Freemason Street Area Historic District of Norfolk, Virginia.

Description and history 
It was built about 1795, and is a two-story, three-bay brick townhouse, approximately 30 feet square. The front facade is stuccoed with stucco quoins in a Classical Revival style. The house has a recessed front entrance framed by a pedimented entablature supported on fluted Roman Doric order columns and pilasters. During the War of 1812, it housed American officers stationed in Norfolk.

It was listed on the National Register of Historic Places on September 22, 1971.

References

Houses on the National Register of Historic Places in Virginia
Neoclassical architecture in Virginia
Houses completed in 1795
Houses in Norfolk, Virginia
National Register of Historic Places in Norfolk, Virginia
Historic district contributing properties in Virginia
Buildings and structures in Norfolk, Virginia